CCUSD may refer to:

Culver City Unified School District, a school district in California
Cave Creek Unified School District, a school district in Arizona

See also
CSUSD